Association Sportive Olympique de Chlef, known as ASO Chlef or simply ASO for short, is an Algerian football club based in Chlef, founded in 1947. The club colours are red and white. Their home stadium, Stade Mohamed Boumezrag, has a capacity of some 20,000 spectators. The club is currently playing in the Algerian Ligue Professionnelle 1.

History
ASO Chlef was founded on June 13, 1947, as Association Sportive d'Orléansville, Orléansville being the colonial name of Chlef at the time. The club was founded by the indigenous Algerian Muslim community of the city who wanted a club to rival the already existing European club in the city, Groupement Sportif Orléansville. In its first season of existence, the club finished second in the third division. In the following two seasons, it won promotion to the first division. After Algeria gained its independence in 1962, the name of the city was changed from Orléansville to El Asnam and the club changed its name to Asnam Sportive Olympique, keeping its original ASO initials.

On June 21, 2005, ASO Chlef won its first domestic title after beating USM Sétif 1–0 in the final of the 2005 Algerian Cup with a goal from Mohamed Messaoud in extra-time. By winning the Cup, they also qualified for continental competition for the first time, earning a spot in the 2006 CAF Confederation Cup. However, their run in African competition came to a quick end. After walking over ASC Entente of Mauritania in the preliminary round, they lost to AS Douanes of Senegal 1–0 on aggregate in the first round.

In the 2007–08 season, ASO Chlef achieved its best league finish to date by finishing second in the Algerian Championnat National, 10 points behind champions JS Kabylie.

On June 21, 2011, led by head coach Meziane Ighil, ASO Chlef won its first Algerian Ligue Professionnelle 1 title after second-placed CR Belouizdad lost to USM El Harrach.

On May 12, 2012, ASO Chlef beat Sudanese club Al-Hilal 4–2 in a penalty shoot-out in the second round of the 2012 CAF Champions League after the two legs ended up tied 2–2 to qualify to the group stage for the first time in the club's history.

Crest

Honours

Domestic competitions 

 Algerian Ligue 1
Champion (1): 2010–11
Runner-up (1): 2007–08

 Algerian Cup
Winner (1): 2004–05
Runner-up (1): 1991–92

Performance in CAF competitions
 CAF Champions League: 2 appearances
2009 – First Round
2012 – Group stage

 CAF Confederation Cup: 2 appearances
2006 – First Round
2007 – Second Round

Players
Algerian teams are limited to two foreign players. The squad list includes only the principal nationality of each player;

Current squad
.

Personnel

Current technical staff

Notable players
Below are the notable former players who have represented ASO Chlef in league and international competition since the club's foundation in 1947. To appear in the section below, a player must have played in at least 100 official matches for the club or represented the national team for which the player is eligible during his stint with ASO Chlef or following his departure.

For a complete list of ASO Chlef players, see :Category:ASO Chlef players

  Abderrazak Belgherbi
  Mohamed Belgherbi
  Farid Cheklam
  Bouabdellah Daoud
  Azzedine Doukha
  Lounès Gaouaoui
  Samir Hadjaoui
  Fodil Megharia
  Mustapha Meksi
  El Arbi Hillel Soudani
  Mohamed Talis
  Alhassane Issoufou

Managers
  Sid-Ahmed Slimani
  Abdelkader Amrani (2003–09)
  Rachid Belhout (July 1, 2007 – June 30, 2008)
  Said Hadj Mansour (July 1, 2008 – June 30, 2009)
  Moussa Saïb (2009)
  Meziane Ighil (July 13, 2010 – Sept 5, 2011)
  Noureddine Saâdi (Sept 6, 2011 – June 30, 2012)
  Rachid Belhout (July 1, 2012 – Oct 25, 2012)
  Mohamed Benchouia (interim) (Oct 23, 2012 – Nov 15, 2012)
  Nour Benzekri (Nov 14, 2012 – Jan 24, 2013)
  Mohamed Benchouia (interim) (Jan 25, 2013 – June 30, 2013)
  Meziane Ighil (July 1, 2013–)

References

External links

Team profile – goalzz.com

 
Football clubs in Algeria
ASO Chlef
Association football clubs established in 1947
Algerian Ligue Professionnelle 1 clubs
1947 establishments in Algeria
Sports clubs in Algeria